Digital Network Intelligence or DNI is a term used in the United States Intelligence Community that refers to "intelligence from intercepted digital data communications transmitted between, or resident on, networked computers."

Programs and units gathering DNI 
 Pinwale, an NSA collection and retrieval system for DNI, including internet e-mail
 STORMBREW, a secret NSA internet surveillance program
 659th Intelligence, Surveillance and Reconnaissance Group of the United States Air Force, an intelligence unit located at Fort George G. Meade, Maryland
 BLARNEY, an NSA communications surveillance program started in 1978
 PRISM, an NSA program, part of the PRISM program, for collecting internet communications from various U.S. internet companies
 OAKSTAR, an upstream collection program of the NSA for secret internet surveillance
 Fairview, a secret NSA program in cooperation with American telecommunications company AT&T
 XKeyscore, a secret NSA computer system for searching and analyzing global Internet data

See also 
 signals intelligence (SIGINT)

References 

United States intelligence agencies